Dibasic ester or DBE is an ester of a dicarboxylic acid.  Depending on the application, the alcohol may be methanol or higher molecular weight monoalcohols.

Mixtures of different methyl dibasic esters are commercially produced from short-chain acids such as adipic acid, glutaric acid, and succinic acid. They are non-flammable, readily biodegradable, non-corrosive, and have a mild, fruity odour.

Dibasic esters of phthalates, adipates, and azelates with C8 - C10 alcohols have found commercial use as lubricants, spin finishes, and additives.

Applications
Dibasic esters are used in paints, coil coatings, paint strippers, coatings, plasticisers, resins, binders, solvents, polyols, soil stabilization, chemical grouting, oilfield drilling fluids, crop protection products, cedar spray, and adhesives.

References

See also
Dibasic (disambiguation)

Painting materials
Household chemicals
Carboxylate esters